Encrinuroides is a genus of trilobites in the order Phacopida, that existed during the upper Ordovician in what is now Wales. It was described by Reed in 1931, and the type species is Encrinuroides sexcostata, which was originally described under the genus Cybele by Salter in 1848. It also contains the species, Encrinuroides enshiensis, Encrinuroides insularis, and Encrinuroides rarus. The type locality was in the Sholeshook Limestone Formation.

Species
 Encrinuroides sexcostata (Salter, 1848)
 Encrinuroides enshiensis
 Encrinuroides rarus (Walcott, 1877) - Originally assigned to Ceraurus; later moved by Chatterton and Ludvigsen in 1976.
 Encrinuroides insularis Shaw, 1968

References

External links
 Encrinuroides at the Paleobiology Database

Encrinuridae genera
Fossil taxa described in 1931
Ordovician trilobites of Europe
Ordovician trilobites of North America
Paleozoic life of Ontario
Verulam Formation
Paleozoic life of the Northwest Territories
Paleozoic life of Quebec